Galeana is a Mexican last name. Several municipalities in Mexico are named Galeana as a homage to Hermenegildo Galeana, a 19th-century Mexican liberal.

Places

Mexico
 Galeana, Nuevo León: A municipality in the state of Nuevo León
 Galeana, Chihuahua: A municipality in the state of Chihuahua
 Hermenegildo Galeana, Chihuahua, a town in Galeana municipality, Chihuahua
 Tecpán de Galeana (municipality): a municipality in the state of Guerrero, 100 km westwards along the coast from Acapulco
 Tecpán de Galeana, a city in the municipality of Tecpán de Galeana
Hermenegildo Galeana, a municipality in the state of Puebla, Mexico

People
 Carlos Alberto Galeana, (born 1988), a Mexican footballer
 Hermenegildo Galeana, (1762-1814), a hero of the Mexican War of Independence

Other
 Galeana (moth), a genus of moths
 Galeana (plant), a genus of plants in the family Asteraceae
 ARM Hermenegildo Galeana, two Mexican navy ships

See also